Cochin College of Engineering and Technology is a self financing engineering college affiliated to University of Calicut, A P J Abdul Kalam Technological University and approved by All India Council for Technical Education (AICTE), New Delhi . It was established in the year 2012, situated at Valanchery in Malappuram District.

Cochin College of Engineering and Technology is managed by a Public Charitable and Educational Trust called World Wide Knowledge Foundation having a registered office in Valanchery.

Courses

See also

References

External links
Cochin College of Engineering and Technology Official Website
 Official Website of Commissionarate of Entrance Examinations-Kerala
University of Calicut
University Grants Commission
National Assessment and Accreditation Council

Colleges affiliated with the University of Calicut
Private engineering colleges in Kerala
Educational institutions established in 2011
Universities and colleges in Malappuram district
2011 establishments in Kerala